Murray County High School (MCHS) is a public high school located in Chatsworth, Georgia, United States. It is part of the Murray County School District.

The school colors are green and white, and its mascot is the Indian. In athletics, it competes as a Division AA school in the Georgia High School Association.

References

External links 
 Murray County High School Marching Indians
 Murray County High School website
 Georgia High School Association website

Public high schools in Georgia (U.S. state)
Schools in Murray County, Georgia